Eistvere is a village in Järva Parish, Järva County in central Estonia.

Notable people
Hermynia Zur Mühlen (1883–1951), Austrian writer and translator
Viktor von zur Mühlen (1879–1950), Baltic German military officer and politician

References

 

Villages in Järva County
Kreis Fellin